"Vitalization" is a Japanese-language song and the 29th single by Japanese singer and voice actress Nana Mizuki, released on July 31, 2013 by King Records. The song commences: "Onegai kikasete... Boku wa koko ni iru kara."

Track listing 
 "Vitalization"
Lyrics: Nana Mizuki
Composition: Noriyasu Agematsu (Elements Garden)
Arrangement: Noriyasu Agematsu (Elements Garden), Daisuke Kikuta (Elements Garden)
Opening theme for anime television series Senki Zesshō Symphogear G 
 "Ai no Hoshi"
Lyrics: Nana Mizuki, Yoshiki Eriko
Composition: Yoshiki Eriko
Arrangement: Hitoshi Fujima (Elements Garden)
Theme song for anime movie Space Battleship Yamato 2199 Chapter 7: Soshite Kan wa Iku 
 "Dramatic Love"
Lyrics: Sayuri
Composition: Koutapai
Arrangement: Shinya Saito
Ending theme for Tokyo FM Mizuki Nana M no Sekai

Charts
Oricon Sales Chart (Japan)

References

2013 singles
Nana Mizuki songs
Songs written by Nana Mizuki
2013 songs
King Records (Japan) singles
Japanese-language songs
Songs with music by Noriyasu Agematsu